MCM Top is a French language music video TV channel owned by MCM Group, a division of Groupe M6.

History
To enrich the offer music channels, Lagardère Active launches November 28, 2003 MCM Music + channels. It is then composed of three channels : MCM, MCM Pop, replacing MCM 2 and MCM Top (newly created), The latter continuously broadcasts current music videos and the target population is 15 to 24 years old.

On June 13, 2007, the channel was reformatted and became interactive. New programs like "Fais Ton Top" and "Fais Ton Club" allow to vote by SMS between two clips for the next clip. Another "Top Mix" show, formerly comparable to Ultra Tubes on MCM, gives the opportunity to vote to choose the program that will be aired in the second part of the evening." Top Club, Top Rock, Top Hip Hop, Top US and Top R'N'B" become rankings made through the votes of viewers on top.mcm.net as well as the "Top.fr" which is comparable to the "hit mcm.fr".

On 1 July 2016, the channel stopped broadcasting on Canalsat, mais elle continue à être diffusée sur les différentes offres ADSL & Câble. On 24 November 2016, the channel returns to Canalsat on the same channel (175) and goes to HD (1920x1080p) for its 13th anniversary.

References 

French-language television stations
Television channels and stations established in 2003
2003 establishments in France